The Peel Sessions 1991–2004 is a compilation album by English alternative rock musician PJ Harvey, released on 23 October 2006 on Island Records.

Release
The Peel Sessions 1991–2004 was released on 23 October 2006 in the United Kingdom, Europe, Canada and the United States on Island Records. The album was pressed on CD and LP. John Peel died two years prior to the album's release and Harvey included a tribute message in the album's liner notes that read: "More than I would ever care to admit for fear of embarrassment to both sides, but I sought his approval always. It mattered. Every Peel Session I did, I did for him. It is with much love that I chose these songs, in his memory. A way of saying 'Thank You', once more. Thank You, John."

The album charted in two countries upon its release. It peaked at number 121 in the UK Albums Chart and number 46 in Ultratop's Belgian Albums Chart in Flanders.

Reception

Upon its release, The Peel Sessions 1991–2004 received largely positive critical acclaim. At Metacritic, which assigns a normalised rating out of 100 to reviews from mainstream critics, the album received an average score of 77, based on 12 reviews, indicating "generally favorable reviews." AllMusic reviewer Heather Phares awarded the album four of out five stars and said the album "feels like a thank you and goodbye to a longtime friend" adding "as good as PJ Harvey's albums are, her concerts are even more striking, and her rapport with Peel just adds to the intimacy and intensity of these songs." Drowned in Sound stated that it "serves as a most welcome and convincing re-reminder of exactly how good PJ Harvey is; it's a record which has simple enjoyment merit as well as being of sound development/obsessive collectors item interest" in its 9/10 review. Matthew Murphy of Pitchfork Media rated the album 7.9/10 and described it as "a vibrant living record whose nervy, protean spirit pushes it miles beyond mere alt-rock radio nostalgia" further adding "that none of these performances ever feels like a throwaway, and each veritably ripples with spontaneous, one-take-only passion." Stylus Magazines Kevin Pearson gave the album a B+ rating saying that "the body of work represented gives both fans and first-timers something to salivate over" but also noted that "several sessions have been overlooked entirely." Uncut and NME also gave the album positive reviews—four out of five stars and 9/10, respectively—with Uncut summarising the album as "stark, often stunning."

Track listing

Personnel
All personnel credits adapted from the album's liner notes.PJ Harvey TrioPJ Harvey – vocals, guitar (1–11)
Steve Vaughan – bass (1–6)
Rob Ellis – drums, backing vocals (1–6, 10, 11), keyboards (10, 11)Other musiciansJohn Parish – guitar, keyboards (7–9)
Margaret Fiedler – guitar, cello (10, 11)
Tim Farthing – guitar (10, 11)
Eric Drew Feldman – bass, keyboards, backing vocals (10, 11)
Josh Klinghoffer – guitar (12)Technical personnelMike Robinson – producer (1–6)
Alison Howe – producer (7–9)
Simon Askew – producer (10, 11)
Andy Rogers – producer (12)
James Birwistle – engineer (1–4)
Ralph Jordan – engineer (5, 6)
Nick Fountain – engineer (7–9)
Miti Adhikari – engineer (12)Design personnel'
Rob Crane – layout, design
Anja Grabert – photography

Chart positions

References

External links
Information about PJ Harvey's sessions for John Peel at Keeping it Peel

PJ Harvey albums
Peel Sessions recordings
2006 live albums
2006 compilation albums